Doloploca is a Palearctic genus of moths belonging to the subfamily Tortricinae of the family Tortricidae.

Species
Doloploca buraetica Staudinger, 1892 East Siberia
Doloploca characterana Snellen, 1883 East Siberia
Doloploca praeviella (Erschoff, 1877) East Siberia
Doloploca punctulana ([Denis & Schiffermuller], 1775) Central Europe
Doloploca supina Razowski, 1975

See also
List of Tortricidae genera

References

External links
tortricidae.com

Tortricidae genera